Daniel Jean-Paul "Danny" Geoffrion (born January 24, 1958) is a Canadian former professional ice hockey player who played 111 games in the National Hockey League and 78 in the World Hockey Association.  He played with the original Winnipeg Jets, Montreal Canadiens, and Quebec Nordiques. As a youth, he played in the 1971 Quebec International Pee-Wee Hockey Tournament with a minor ice hockey team from Dorval, Quebec.

Since his retirement from hockey, Dan is now a scout for the Toronto Maple Leafs.

Personal
He is the son of NHL Hall of Famer Bernie Geoffrion and grandson of Howie Morenz.

He is the father of Blake Geoffrion, who played 67 career NHL games (regular season and playoffs) from 2010 until 2012.

Geoffrion is also the uncle of former Seattle Mariners outfielder Shane Monahan.

Career statistics

References

External links

1958 births
Living people
Canadian ice hockey right wingers
Cornwall Royals (QMJHL) players
Ice hockey people from Montreal
Montreal Canadiens draft picks
Montreal Canadiens players
National Hockey League first-round draft picks
Quebec Nordiques (WHA) players
Sherbrooke Jets players
Toronto Maple Leafs scouts
Tulsa Oilers (1964–1984) players
Winnipeg Jets (1979–1996) players
Canadian expatriate ice hockey players in the United States